West End is a parish in Hampshire in the borough of Eastleigh,  east of the city of Southampton. The village of West End is small and generally classed as an area in the outer suburbs or rural urban fringe of the borough of Eastleigh because of the surrounding woodland and countryside, including Telegraph Woods and Itchen Valley Country Park.

The village is mainly known for being home of the Rose Bowl, the stadium where Hampshire County Cricket Club plays, and occasionally England.

Aside from a typical number of listed houses, main landmarks of the parish are Moorgreen Hospital — a large, ornate Victorian building, the original St James School, built in 1901, on the high street, and West End Fire Station — a museum in the centre of the village.

History

Early history
A series of round barrows, dating from the Bronze Age (2000-600 BC), have been discovered in the Moorgreen area of the parish. There were five of these to the north of the former Moorgreen Hospital site.  A hilltop fort from the Iron Age was built on the ridge above the village around 600-100BC.  A shutter telegraph station operated from the site during the Napoleonic Wars, forming part of the line connecting London to Plymouth.  It was this station that gave the name to the nearby Telegraph Woods.

The village was originally a hamlet which grew up around a track between Romsey and Portsmouth.  The hamlet had a chapel by 1552 primarily for the use of the lords of the manor of Allington. When the track became a turnpike road in the early 19th century, the hamlet began to grow.

19th century

In 1838, a national school was opened to house 192 children.  St James' Church was founded in the same year.

The hamlet was mostly within the tithing of Shamblehurst, with a small section at the northern end in the tithing of Allington, both within the parish of South Stoneham. The ecclesiastical parish of West End was established in 1840, two years after the construction of the original St James' Church.  In 1846 a Bible Christian chapel was constructed in Chapel Road.

A poor house had existed at the eastern end of the village for some time, and in 1848 this was replaced by a red-brick workhouse. This eventually became Moorgreen Hospital.

An extra room was added to the national school in 1866. In 1871 an independent school for younger children was opened, having been built by Mrs Harriet Hazlefoot.

In 1890, the spire of St James' was struck by lightning and the building was replaced. The civil parish was established in 1894.  A number of boundary changes have taken place since then.

Harriet Hazlefoot's school became the infants' department of the national school in 1894.

20th century
During the 20th century, the school moved again into a new (third) building and was renamed St James' Primary School. The second school building became Hilldene Community Centre, where a number of adult education courses and other activities take place.

In 1900, two further Methodist chapels were built, one in the Moorgreen area and one in Swaythling Road. In September 1904 the children of the national school were moved to a new location with the old school building becoming the parish hall.

The fire station was opened in May 1939 by Mrs Pearson of Oaklands in Allington Lane. The station was crewed by a mixture of National Fire Service and Auxiliary Fire Service personnel, and the station housed a Dennis New World fire engine.

In 1954, Harefield was transferred out of the civil parish and into Southampton.

A Roman Catholic church building was opened in the village in 1961.

Richard St. Barbe Baker did a lot of his career work in West End, where he made a Project costing £180,000 to improve West End's High Street, by upgrading pavement slabs, plus adding safety rails, better lighting, removing all graffiti and damaged planters. The scheme also produced CCTV cameras managed by S & P Southampton Ltd. Near the end of the High Street, a plaque in his honour was made to thank all good things he has done for West End, plus a road named after him (Barbe Baker Avenue) was also created.

The fire station was closed in 1996 and the building was transferred to the parish council to run as a community venue. West End Local History Society established at the same time set up its museum in the building.

21st century

The Rose Bowl cricket ground was built in 2000 along with an accompanying hotel and conference facilities and a 18-hole golf course. It has hosted several international cricket games and a number of well known musical acts such as Oasis, The Who, Neil Diamond, R.E.M. and Billy Joel.

Government
Matters such as social events, footpaths and sports facilities are governed by the (civil) parish council. Much greater expenditure is managed by the local Borough and Hampshire County Councils. The civil parish council has 14 seats across three wards: West End North, West End South and Kanes Hill.

Culture and community
The annual West End Carnival takes place each June, although it did not run in 2009 or 2010 due to a lack of volunteers. The parish has an active local history society which runs a museum in the old fire station in the village centre.

Education
There is one primary school in the village of West End, St. James School. Its predecessor is on the High Street built in 1901 which for a time during the late 20th century became St James's Pre-School.

Sport
Hampshire County Cricket Club's home ground, the Rose Bowl, is in the east of the parish between the M27 and Telegraph Woods. It has a hotel adjoining.

Notable people
Forester and environmental activist Richard St. Barbe Baker was born in West End.

RMS Titanic rescuer and engineer

Sir Arthur Henry Rostron
In the West End's Old Burial Ground, Sir Arthur Henry Rostron is buried. As captain of the  he was famous for rescuing 706 of her passengers and crew when  sank on 15 April 1912  and was awarded many honours, including being created a Knight Commander of the Order of the British Empire (KBE), as well as being awarded a Congressional Gold Medal. In the latter part of his life, he decided to spend his retirement in West End, where he stayed until he died in 1940.

James Jukes
Henry James Jukes was a West End born and brought up man, who lived in Camlens House, Moorgreen Road, West End. James' parents, Joseph and Elizabeth Jukes, ran a garden holding and James was soon to be married. James was on board the Titanic as a part of the engineering department, or as it was better known, the 'black crew', but, aged 35 years, dived into the North Atlantic Ocean, and went down with the ship. In his honour, in 2002,  a housing development on Moorgreen Road was named 'Jukes Walk'.

There are plaques in West End Museum for both Rostron and Jukes.

See also
List of places of worship in the Borough of Eastleigh

References

External links
 West End Carnival
 West End Local History Society
 West End Parish Council

Villages in Hampshire
Civil parishes in Hampshire
Borough of Eastleigh